Climate change in Taiwan has caused temperatures in Taiwan to rise by 1.4 degrees Celsius the last 100 years. The sea around Taiwan is to rise at twice the rate of the global sea level rise. The government pledged to reduce emissions by 20% in 2030 and 50% in 2050, compared to 2005 levels.

Greenhouse gas emissions 

In 2020 the annual  emissions were 273.17mt and 11.47t per capita, since 2005 there have been a stabilisation of  emissions with the annual  emissions increasing with 2.52% and the per capita  emissions decreasing with 2.26% between 2005 and 2020. In 2020 the cumulative  emissions were 9.05 billion tonnes, in 2020 Taiwan was responsible for 0.78% of worldwide emissions.  The government of Taiwan has pledged to reduce emissions by 20% in 2030 and 50% in 2050 comparing to 2005 levels. Taichung Power Plant is estimated to have been one of the ten most carbon polluting coal-fired power plants in the world in 2018, at 29.9 million tons of carbon dioxide, and relative emissions are estimated at 1.282 kg per kWh.

Impacts on the natural environment

Temperature and weather changes 

According to the Taiwan Climate Change Projection Information and Adaptation Knowledge Platform (TCCIP) the number of days that record above 36 degree Celsius in the plains of Taiwan can go from less than 1 day a year in 2021 to 48.1 days in 2100 if the global temperature rise isn't kept under 1.5 degree Celsius, if it is kept under 1.5 degree Celsius there would be 6.6 days a years with such temperatures. The summers could also be extended by the end of the century from 80 days to 210 days, the winters will become shorter with 0 to 50 days compared to 70 days in 2021. The summer of 2020 has been recorded as having the hottest weather ever in Taiwan.

Sea level rise 
In a report that Greenpeace Taiwan published in August 2020, it was reported that the sea around Taiwan is rising at twice the rate of the global sea level rise. They said 6 municipalities are in danger of sea level rise and storm surges which accounts for 70% of the population. Places like the Presidential Office Building in Taipei, Songshan Airport, parts of Kaohsiung would be flooded and Tainan would see the biggest damage due to flooding.

Ecosystems 

Coral reefs in Taiwan have experienced bleaching with 2020 experiencing the worst bleaching in 22 years. 31% of coral reefs around Taiwan are dying due to high temperatures in the sea water. 52% of the corals is experiencing different levels of heat stress and 31% is dying in an irreversible process.

Water resources 
Shortages in water reservoirs have been announced in 2020 caused by typhoons not making landfall on Taiwan or going near Taiwan this was the first year in more than 50 years that Taiwan didn't see a storm. Typhoons would normally make landfall three to four times a year but since 2010 the average has been 2.5 typhoons a year.  2020 has experienced the worst drought in more than 50 years as rainfall declined with 20% to 60%.

Northern Taiwan could experience more frequent spring droughts between 2040 and 2060, which could have an effect on the water use for the public and water use for agriculture. At the end of the century typhoons that make landfall in Taiwan will decrease between 44% to 54% comparing to typhoons that made landfall between 1974 and 2015. Which would lead to stronger winds by 4% to 8% and more rainfall during the typhoon with 30% to 40%, the rainfall annually would drop with 40% to 60%.

Mitigation and adaptation

Policies and legislation 
The Taiwanese government has pledged to increase renewable energy usage to 20% by 2025. The government pledged to reduce emissions by 20% in 2030 and 50% in 2050, compared to 2005 levels, which was signed to by the 2015 Taiwan Greenhouse Gas Reduction and Management Act. This would not be enough to keep global temperatures between 1.5-2 degrees Celsius, according to the RSPRC. The government of Taiwan has invested in the wind turbine industry, Taiwan had the 8th biggest offshore wind market in the world in 2019.

Society and culture

Public perception 
According to a survey that the RSPRC conducted in April 2020, 85% of Taiwanese said that they experienced the effects of climate change on some level. The survey also found that acceleration of energy transition and reduction in carbon was ranked in third place with 38.7% when asked what the government long terms priorities should be. There is bipartisan support under supporters of the Pan-Blue camp (76.2%) and the Pan-Green camp (84%) for a proactive promotion of an energy transition. 78.5% of the respondents supported the governments targets for 2025 to have 20% of renewable energy in 2025. Respondents gave 3.83 out of 7 points for how fair the energy transition is, they gave 3.74 out of 7 points to how well planned the energy transition is and they gave 4.32 out of 7 points on how urgent the government acted on it. 44.7% are supportive to phase out fossil fuels, 43.7% were against phasing out fossil fuels. Academics and experts were the most trusted when talking about energy information (59.3%), environmental groups came second (37.6%). 59.8% of respondents said that businesses should be required to have obligations with the energy transition if they get stimulus from the government to help them through COVID-19, 77.2% of respondents wanted that they did the same for airlines.

See also 
 Plug-in electric vehicles in Taiwan

References 

Climate of Taiwan
Taiwan
Taiwan
Environment of Taiwan